Vaterland is a neighborhood in Oslo, Norway. It is located north of the tracks at Oslo Central Station, between Jernbanetorget, Storgata and Akerselva river. The area features Oslo Central Station and Oslo Bus Terminal, the shopping centers Oslo City and Byporten, Galleri Oslo, Radisson Blu Plaza Hotel, the concert arena Oslo Spektrum and Postgirobygget. Along the Aker River lays the Vaterland Park.

Neighbourhoods of Oslo